Maria-Christina Oliveras is an American television, stage and film actor, singer and voice-over artist. She has performed extensively on Broadway, off-Broadway, regionally, and in various films and episodics, and is known for her versatility and transformational character work in a number of world premieres.  She is of Filipino and Puerto Rican descent.

Early life 

Born in New York City, Oliveras is first-generation American.  The daughter of Beatrice, a nurse, and Luis Tomas, a hospital food service administrator, she grew up in the Bronx. She studied at Yale University, and received her B.A. with honors in Theater Studies.  While there, she was an active participant in Yale Undergraduate theater, where she first met Alex Timbers, who she has subsequently collaborated with on a number of projects, most notably Here Lies Love.  She was also a member of the esteemed a cappella groups, SHADES (whose alumni include fellow Broadway colleagues, Anika Larsen and Lauren Worsham) and WHIM N' RHYTHM.

In summer of 2004, Oliveras was accepted into the Shakespeare Lab at the Public Theatre, where she studied with Ron Van Lieu, Kate Wilson and Michael Cumpsty, both of whom she later worked with on Broadway in Machinal.  One of 8 students chosen, Oliveras went on to receive her M.F.A. in acting from the National Theatre Conservatory in 2007.

Career 

Upon graduation from the National Theatre Conservatory, Oliveras moved back to New York City, and immediately started working on and off-Broadway, and in film and television.  She made her Broadway debut in Bloody Bloody Andrew Jackson, also directed by Alex Timbers.  She returned to Broadway in the Roundabout Theater’s revival of Machinal, playing multiple roles opposite Rebecca Hall.  Dedicated to new works, other off-Broadway credits include the world premieres of: The Civilians' production of Pretty Filthy by Bess Wohl and Michael Friedman, directed by Steve Cosson, Here Lies Love at the Public Theater, Reading Under the Influence, starring Barbara Walsh, directed by Wendy Goldberg, Night Sky, starring Jordan Baker, directed by Daniella Topol; The Really Big Once, directed by David Herskovits; And Miles to Go, directed by Hal Brooks; After, directed by Stephen Brackett; Slavey, directed by Robert O’Hara.

In 2015, she originated the role of Suzanne in the world premiere of Amélie at Berkeley Rep, directed by Pam MacKinnon, book by Craig Lucas, music by Daniel Messe, lyrics by Nathan Tysen and Daniel Messe, musical staging by Sam Pinkleton, and musical direction by Kim Grigsby.

In 2016, she returned to the Public, where she first studied Shakespeare, to play the Nurse in Romeo and Juliet, directed by Lear DeBessonet for the Mobile Shakespeare Unit. In the summer, she played Macbeth in a critically acclaimed three-woman production of Macbeth, directed by Lee Sunday Evans, which the New York Times hailed as "irreducible and transcendent," and Jacques in As You Like It, directed by Gaye Taylor Upchurch, both at Hudson Valley Shakespeare Festival.

In Spring 2017, Maria-Christina returned to Broadway in Amélie at the Walter Kerr Theatre, in the role of Gina, after having originated a sold-out pre-Broadway run at the Ahmanson in Los Angeles. She subsequently went on to star in We're Gonna Die by Young Jean Lee at the Ancram Opera House.

In Spring 2018, she returned to Los Angeles and Center Theatre Group for the world premiere of Soft Power, a new play with a musical, book by David Henry Hwang, music by Jeanine Tesori, directed by Leigh Silverman, choreographed by Sam Pinkelton and music directed by Chris Fenwick.

In Fall 2018, Maria-Christina returned to New Haven to do the world premiere of "El Huracan" by Charise Castro Smith, directed by Laurie Woolery at the Yale Repertory Theater.

In Spring/Summer 2019 and subsequently Spring/Summer 2022, Maria-Christina starred as Tolima in Kiss My Aztec, a new musical by John Leguizamo and Tony Taccone, music by Benjamin Velez, lyrics by John Leguizamo, Benjamin Velez and David Kamp, and directed by Tony Taccone, at Hartford Stage, Berkeley Rep and La Jolla Playhouse. She has been a part of the development of the show since Atlantic Theatre's Latino MixFest in 2015.

In August 2022, it was announced that Maria-Christina would join the National Broadway Tour in October as Persephone in the Grammy and Tony Award-winning musical Hadestown, directed by Rachel Chavkin.

In January 2023, it was announced that Oliveras would return to Broadway to join the cast of the Second Stage Theater revival of Stephen Adly Guirgis's Between Riverside and Crazy in the role of Church Lady, replacing Liza Colón-Zayas.

As a vocalist, Maria-Christina has lent her talents to such esteemed artists as Taylor Mac, Toshi Reagon, and Heather Christian. She was a featured vocalist for the world premiere of Taylor Mac's A 24 DECADE HISTORY OF POPULAR MUSIC at St. Ann's Warehouse, and subsequently the West Coast Premiere at the Curran in San Francisco.   Maria-Christina has also been a part of the development of THE PARABLE OF THE SOWER, based on the book by Octavia Butler, created by Beatrice and Toshi Reagon.  She did the world premiere in Abu Dhabi, the North American Premiere in North Carolina, and was a part of the piece at the Public's UNDER THE RADAR Festival in January 2018.

Her regional credits include Here Lies Love at the Williamstown Theatre Festival; Laura Jacqmin's January Joiner at the Long Wharf, directed by Eric Ting; Jose Rivera’s Boleros for the Disenchanted at the Huntington Theater, directed by Chay Yew; Lynn Nottage’s Fabulation at Baltimore CenterStage, directed by Jackson Gay; the world premiere of Unbeatable, starring Kristy Cates, for which Oliveras received the Arizoni Award for Best Supporting Actress in a Musical; the regional premiere of Rent at the Hangar Theater, directed by Dev Janki; numerous shows at the Denver Center; Colorado Shakespeare Festival; Westport Country Playhouse; among others.

Oliveras was the 2014 recipient of the Charles Bowden Actor Award from New Dramatists, whose previous honorees include Jessica Hecht and Lynn Cohen.  She is also a member of the distinguished Actors' Center Workshop Company, whose membership includes Judy Kuhn and Frank Wood. Oliveras is an alumna of the Lark Play Development Center Playground and New Dramatists' Composer-Librettist Studio, actor for the 52nd Street Project and has done numerous readings and workshops with the O'Neill Center, NYSAF/Vassar, Working Theatre, the Lark, New Dramatists, INTAR, Manhattan Theatre Club, Lincoln Center Directors' Lab, The Public Theatre, the Playwrights' Realm, Ensemble Studio Theater, Ars Nova, hotInk, Page 73, Ma-Yi, PRTT, NYTW, EST, Urban Stages, NAMT Festival of New Musicals, and Atlantic Theater, to name a few.  She is a member of Partial Comfort Productions and an Associate Artist with the Civilians.

She can be heard on the original cast recordings of "Here Lies Love," "Pretty Filthy" and "The Abominables," part of the Michael Friedman Legacy Project.

Her film and television credits include Time Out of Mind, directed by Oren Moverman, The Humbling, directed by Barry Levinson, The Other Woman, directed by Nick Cassavettes, and St. Vincent, directed by Theodore Melfi, among others.  Her television credits include "The Blacklist," "Madam Secretary," Nurse Jackie, Law and Order: Svu, Law and Order:CI, Person of Interest, NYC:22, Golden Boy, and Damages.
In 2012, Oliveras was asked to return to Yale University to teach acting and to conduct a number of seminars. She has also served as a guest teacher and speaker for University of Colorado-Boulder, SUNY New Paltz, Princeton University, ECA, La Jolla Country Day, Berkeley Rep School of Theater, Las Positas, New York University, Step Up Women’s Network, University of Iowa, the Public Theater’s Shakespeare in the Boroughs Program, Children’s Aid Society, National Theater Conservatory, and Denver Center Theater Academy.  She has served on the faculty of Fordham University at Lincoln Center, Stella Adler, Broadway Workshop, Primary Stages, and Yale University and is currently the Assistant Professor of Acting at Wesleyan University and teaches Musical Theater Performance at Yale University.

References 

Year of birth missing (living people)
Living people
American stage actresses
21st-century American women